Huaihejieshenyieryuan is an interchange station on lines 9 and 10 of the Shenyang Metro. The Line 9 station opened on 25 May 2019, and the Line 10 station opened on 29 April 2020.

Station Layout

References 

Railway stations in China opened in 2019
Shenyang Metro stations